Fluometuron is an herbicide.  In the United States it was approved for use on cotton and sugarcane crops in 1974, but since 1986 is only approved for use on cotton.

External links

References

Ureas
Herbicides
Trifluoromethyl compounds
Anilides